Mäksa Parish was a rural municipality in Tartu County, Estonia.

Settlements
Villages
Aruaia - Kaagvere - Kaarlimõisa - Kastre - Mäksa - Mäletjärve - Melliste - Poka - Sarakuste - Sudaste - Tammevaldma - Tigase - Vana-Kastre - Veskimäe - Võõpste - Võruküla

Twinnings
 Kannonkoski Municipality, Finland

See also
Lake Agali

References

External links

Former municipalities of Estonia